Baby Aline Vargas-Alfonso (born in Abulug, Cagayan) is a Filipina politician who currently serves as the representative of Cagayan's 2nd District since 2022 and previously from 2011 to 2019. She is the youngest daughter of former Congressman and Governor Florencio Vargas. Vargas-Alfonso served as Vice Mayor of Abulug from 2007 to 2010. After her father died on July 22, 2010, she successfully ran for Congress in a special election in 2011 to finish his term. Vargas-Alfonso accused that she is one of sources of fake SARO (Special Allotment Release Order) forms. In 2019, Vargas-Alfonso finished her three consecutive terms as Congresswoman from Cagayan's Second District.
Her daughter Sam Vargas Alfonso succeeded her in 2019.

References

External links 
 

Lakas–CMD politicians
Members of the House of Representatives of the Philippines from Cagayan
20th-century Filipino politicians
20th-century Filipino women politicians
21st-century Filipino politicians
21st-century Filipino women politicians
National Unity Party (Philippines) politicians
Living people
Year of birth missing (living people)